The Daktaris, whose name means "doctors" in Swahili, were an Afrobeat revival group based in Brooklyn. The group no longer exists today, though some of its members have gone on to be part of Antibalas Afrobeat Orchestra. The Daktaris were named after Daktari, an American family drama series that aired on CBS between 1966 and 1969, a fictional Study Center for Animal Behavior in East Africa.

Basing its sound on the style of 1970s African musicians like Fela Kuti, The Daktaris are today known for the faked Nigerian origin of their album Soul Explosion, which included Africanized personnel names, a vintage cover, and a "Produced in Nigeria" label. They make reference to their forged backstory in the track title "Eltsuhg Ibal Lasiti", which is "It Is All A Big Hustle" backwards. Soul Explosion was originally recorded in 1998 and released under the Desco label. It was reissued by Daptone Records in 2004.

References

Afro-beat musical groups
Musical groups from New York (state)